Sam Hay was an footballer who played inside-right for Thames Ironworks, the club that would later become West Ham United. He was born in Renfrewshire, Scotland, and played for Victoria, until being signed up by the Irons for the 1895–96 season, where he became a regular choice.

See also
 Thames Ironworks F.C. season 1895–96
 Thames Ironworks F.C. season 1896–97
 Thames Ironworks F.C. season 1897–98
 Thames Ironworks F.C. season 1898–99

References

External links
Sam Hay at westhamstats.info

Year of birth missing
Year of death missing
Footballers from Renfrewshire
Scottish footballers
Association football inside forwards
Blantyre Victoria F.C. players
Thames Ironworks F.C. players